Pholisora is a genus of skippers in the family Hesperiidae.

Species
Pholisora catullus (Fabricius, 1793) Common Sootywing
Pholisora mejicanus (Reakirt, [1867)

References
Natural History Museum Lepidoptera genus database
Pholisora at funet

Carcharodini
Taxa named by Samuel Hubbard Scudder
Hesperiidae genera